Ruslan Kuznetsov (born 20 October 1980) is a Russian Para-cyclist who represented Russian Paralympic Committee athletes at the 2020 Summer Paralympics.

Career
Kuznetsov represented Russian Paralympic Committee athletes at the 2020 Summer Paralympics in the road time trial H3 event and finished in fourth place with a time of 43:49.24. He also competed in the road race H3 event and won a gold medal. 
National championship:
2016 1st place in road race 35km,
2017 1st place in time trial 15km,
2018 2nd place time trial 15km,
2019 1st place in time trial 15km,
2020 1st place in time trial 15km,
2021 1st place in time trial 15km.
UCI Road world cup Ostend Belgium 2021 3rd place in time trial.

References

Living people
1969 births
Cyclists from Moscow
Russian male cyclists
Cyclists at the 2020 Summer Paralympics
Medalists at the 2020 Summer Paralympics
Paralympic medalists in cycling
Paralympic gold medalists for the Russian Paralympic Committee athletes